Rio Vista Pond is located in Rio Vista Park in south central Peoria, Arizona, United States, on Rio Vista Boulevard, just north of Thunderbird Road.

Fish species
 Rainbow trout
 Largemouth bass
 Sunfish
 Catfish (channel)
 Tilapia
 Carp

See also

 Indian Mesa
 List of historic properties in Peoria, Arizona
 Peoria, Arizona
 Weedville

References

External links

Reservoirs in Arizona
Reservoirs in Maricopa County, Arizona
Geography of Peoria, Arizona